Qafarlı (also, Kafarlı and Kafarly) is a village and municipality in the Barda Rayon of Azerbaijan.  It has a population of 396.

References 

Populated places in Barda District